Hazo may refer to:

 Hajo, a pilgrimage site in Assam, India 
 Hazzo or Hazo Kozluk in Turkey
 Hazo, son of Nahor, a minor Biblical character
 Samuel Hazo (born 1966), American composer
 Samuel John Hazo (born 1928), American writer

See also 
 Hazu, Aichi, a town in Japan